IgGFc-binding protein is a protein that in humans is encoded by the FCGBP gene.

References

Further reading